Omar Agrebi (born 26 August 1992 in Sfax, Tunisia) is a Tunisian volleyball player. He is 195 cm high and plays as middle blocker.

Clubs

Awards

Club
  Arab Clubs Championship (2013)
  Tunisian League (2013)

National team
  African Championship U21 (2010)
  Arab Championship U19 (2009)

References

People from Sfax
1992 births
Living people
Tunisian men's volleyball players
Volleyball players at the 2020 Summer Olympics
Olympic volleyball players of Tunisia
20th-century Tunisian people
21st-century Tunisian people